World Park Base was a non-governmental year-round Antarctic base located at Cape Evans on Ross Island in the Ross Dependency. The international environmental organization Greenpeace established World Park Base in 1987 in order to press its demand for the Antarctic Treaty nations to declare all of the continent of Antarctica a World Park. This would make the entire continent off-limits to commercial exploitation and pollution, and  permit only limited scientific research. Greenpeace closed down and completely dismantled the base in 1992.

The official attitude amongst the Antarctic Treaty nations was that World Park Base was to be ignored and that no assistance be given to it, although New Zealand, which claims jurisdiction over Ross Dependency (though all territorial claims are in abeyance under the Antarctic Treaty), would have assisted if a life-threatening situation arose.

See also
 List of Antarctic research stations
 List of Antarctic field camps

References

External links
 Greenpeace World Park Base 1987-92
 Greenpeace in Antarctica
 Creating the World Park Antarctica

Greenpeace
Outposts of Antarctica
Ross Island
Outposts of the Ross Dependency
1987 establishments in Antarctica
1992 disestablishments in Antarctica